Dunseverick is a hamlet near the Giant's Causeway in County Antrim, Northern Ireland. The name is also the alias for the townland of Feigh. It is most notable for Dunseverick Castle.

One of the five great highways, or slighe of ancient Ireland, Slige Midluachra, had its terminal point at Dunseverick, running from here to Emain Macha and further to royal Tara and the fording point on the Liffey at what is now Dublin.

The hamlet of Dunseverick itself lies in the adjacent townland of Currysheskin.

References

External links
National Trust
Dunseverick website
Ballycastle Free — Dunseverick
LibraryIreland — Dunseverick

Villages in County Antrim
Hamlets in Northern Ireland